The Zire 31 is a Zire Handheld from palmOne. The product was first released in April 2004 as a replacement for Zire 21. It runs Palm OS 5.2.8 and features a color 160×160 display, a SDIO slot and a standard 3.5mm stereo headphones jack. The improved PIM apps (Calendar, Contacts, Tasks and Memos) are supplied. The ROM includes RealOne Player giving the device some digital audio player capabilities. They can be extended with 3rd party software, such as TCPMP. The Zire 31 has a 5-way navigator pad, but still only 2 quickbuttons, as opposed to the standard 4 on the mid-range Zires 71/72. It was replaced by the Z22, which lacks the SD/MMC/SDIO Expansion and headphone jack.

Specifications

References

External links
 Official Palm Zire 31 Support information.
 More information about the Zire 31 from the official United States  website
 More information about the Zire 31 from the official European website
 31 User Manual

See also
 Zire Handheld
 List of Palm OS devices

Palm OS devices